Salvia amissa, the Santa Catalina Mountain sage, Galiuro sage, or Aravaipa sage, is a herbaceous perennial plant that is endemic to Arizona, growing in the Galiuro Mountains and the Superstition Mountains. The type specimen is from the Santa Catalina Mountains, though plants have not been recorded there in recent years. S. amissa grows at  elevation in gravel, sand, and silt in canyon bottoms shaded by ash, walnut, sycamore, and mesquite.

References

External links
 IPNI Listing
 USDA Plant Profile
 Kew Plant List

amissa